Lake is an "L" station on the CTA's Red Line in the Chicago Loop that is part of the State Street subway. Lake is a transfer station between the Red Line and the Brown, Green, Orange, Pink, and Purple Lines at the  station and the Blue Line at  via the Chicago Pedway. In 2019, Lake had an average of 19,364 weekday passenger entries, making it the busiest 'L' station.

Lake is linked to Millennium Station and Millennium Park via a Chicago Pedway connection that can be accessed at its Randolph–Washington exit.

On November 20, 2009, the Chicago Pedway connecting the unpaid portions of Lake and  stations reopened to service.

In addition it got Dunkin Donuts, in the subway station and the first two shopping areas, Macy's and the same goes to Block 37.

This station was originally part of the now-abandoned  station. The two were separated on June 2, 1996, due to the renovation project of the Randolph-Washington mezzanine and Lake became an independent station on November 18, 1997, in order to better facilitate transfers between the Red Line subway and the elevated  station.

Bus connections
CTA
 2 Hyde Park Express (Weekday Rush Hours Only) 
 6 Jackson Park Express
 10 Museum of Science and Industry (Memorial Day through Labor Day only) 
 29 State
 36 Broadway
 62 Archer (Owl Service) 
 146 Inner Lake Shore/Michigan Express

Notes and references

Notes

References

External links

 Lake/State Station Page at Chicago-'L'.org
 Train schedule (PDF) at CTA official site
Lake/State Station Page on the CTA official site
Lake Street entrance from Google Maps Street View
Randolph Street entrance from Google Maps Street View

CTA Red Line stations
Railway stations in the United States opened in 1996
1996 establishments in Illinois